Garah is a town in north western New South Wales, Australia. The town is in the Moree Plains Shire local government area.

Geography 
It is on the Mungindi railway line (also known as the North West railway line) between Mungindi and Moree.

History 

The name of the town is an Aboriginal word meaning long or a long distance.

The Garah railway station was open between 1913 and 1974.

A branch of the Bank of New South Wales was opened in Garah in January 1919.

The Presbyterian church in Garah was officially opened on Sunday 21 April 1929 by the Right Reverend A. P. Camerson, church Moderator.

Facilities 
Facilities in the town include a post office, primary school, police station, tennis courts, grain silo, CWA hall, town hall, pre-school, corner shop, pub, race course, small petrol bowser, Catholic church and a Presbyterian Church. Local activities include agriculture.

Events 
Garah is also said to have the oldest running picnic races in Australia.

References

External links

Towns in New England (New South Wales)
Moree Plains Shire